The coastline paradox is the counterintuitive observation that the coastline of a landmass does not have a well-defined length.  This results from the fractal curve-like properties of coastlines; i.e., the fact that a coastline typically has a fractal dimension.   Although the "paradox of length" was previously noted by Hugo Steinhaus, the first systematic study of this phenomenon was by Lewis Fry Richardson, and it was expanded upon by Benoit Mandelbrot.

The measured length of the coastline depends on the method used to measure it and the degree of cartographic generalization. Since a landmass has features at all scales, from hundreds of kilometers in size to tiny fractions of a millimeter and below, there is no obvious size of the smallest feature that should be taken into consideration when measuring, and hence no single well-defined perimeter to the landmass. Various approximations exist when specific assumptions are made about minimum feature size.

The problem is fundamentally different from the measurement of other, simpler edges. It is possible, for example, to accurately measure the length of a straight, idealized metal bar by using a measurement device to determine that the length is less than a certain amount and greater than another amount—that is, to measure it within a certain degree of uncertainty. The more accurate the measurement device, the closer results will be to the true length of the edge. When measuring a coastline, however, the closer measurement does not result in an increase in accuracy—the measurement only increases in length; unlike with the metal bar, there is no way to obtain a maximum value for the length of the coastline.

In three-dimensional space, the coastline paradox is readily extended to the concept of fractal surfaces, whereby the area of a surface varies depending on the measurement resolution.

Mathematical aspects 

The basic concept of length originates from Euclidean distance. In Euclidean geometry, a straight line represents the shortest distance between two points. This line has only one length. On the surface of a sphere, this is replaced by the geodesic length (also called the great circle length), which is measured along the surface curve that exists in the plane containing both endpoints and the center of the sphere. The length of basic curves is more complicated but can also be calculated. Measuring with rulers, one can approximate the length of a curve by adding the sum of the straight lines which connect the points:

Using a few straight lines to approximate the length of a curve will produce an estimate lower than the true length; when increasingly short (and thus more numerous) lines are used, the sum approaches the curve's true length. A precise value for this length can be found using calculus, the branch of mathematics enabling the calculation of infinitesimally small distances. The following animation illustrates how a smooth curve can be meaningfully assigned a precise length:

Not all curves can be measured in this way. A fractal is, by definition, a curve whose complexity changes with measurement scale. Whereas approximations of a smooth curve tend to a single value as measurement precision increases, the measured value for a fractal does not converge.

As the length of a fractal curve always diverges to infinity, if one were to measure a coastline with infinite or near-infinite resolution, the length of the infinitely short kinks in the coastline would add up to infinity. However, this figure relies on the assumption that space can be subdivided into infinitesimal sections. The truth value of this assumption—which underlies Euclidean geometry and serves as a useful model in everyday measurement—is a matter of philosophical speculation, and may or may not reflect the changing realities of "space" and "distance" on the atomic level (approximately the scale of a nanometer).

Coastlines are less definite in their construction than idealized fractals such as the Mandelbrot set because they are formed by various natural events that create patterns in statistically random ways, whereas idealized fractals are formed through repeated iterations of simple, formulaic sequences.

Discovery
Shortly before 1951, Lewis Fry Richardson, in researching the possible effect of border lengths on the probability of war, noticed that the Portuguese reported their measured border with Spain to be 987 km, but the Spanish reported it as 1214 km. This was the beginning of the coastline problem, which is a mathematical uncertainty inherent in the measurement of boundaries that are irregular.

The prevailing method of estimating the length of a border (or coastline) was to lay out n equal straight-line segments of length ℓ with dividers on a map or aerial photograph. Each end of the segment must be on the boundary. Investigating the discrepancies in border estimation, Richardson discovered what is now termed the "Richardson effect": the sum of the segments is monotonically increasing when the common length of the segments is decreased. In effect, the shorter the ruler, the longer the measured border; the Spanish and Portuguese geographers were simply using different-length rulers.

The result most astounding to Richardson is that, under certain circumstances, as ℓ approaches zero, the length of the coastline approaches infinity. Richardson had believed, based on Euclidean geometry, that a coastline would approach a fixed length, as do similar estimations of regular geometric figures. For example, the perimeter of a regular polygon inscribed in a circle approaches the circumference with increasing numbers of sides (and decrease in the length of one side). In geometric measure theory such a smooth curve as the circle that can be approximated by small straight segments with a definite limit is termed a rectifiable curve.

Measuring a coastline

More than a decade after Richardson completed his work, Benoit Mandelbrot developed a new branch of mathematics, fractal geometry, to describe just such non-rectifiable complexes in nature as the infinite coastline. His own definition of the new figure serving as the basis for his study is:

A key property of some fractals is self-similarity; that is, at any scale the same general configuration appears. A coastline is perceived as bays alternating with promontories. In the hypothetical situation that a given coastline has this property of self-similarity, then no matter how great any one small section of coastline is magnified, a similar pattern of smaller bays and promontories superimposed on larger bays and promontories appears, right down to the grains of sand. At that scale the coastline appears as a momentarily shifting, potentially infinitely long thread with a stochastic arrangement of bays and promontories formed from the small objects at hand. In such an environment (as opposed to smooth curves) Mandelbrot asserts "coastline length turns out to be an elusive notion that slips between the fingers of those who want to grasp it".

There are different kinds of fractals. A coastline with the stated property is in "a first category of fractals, namely curves whose fractal dimension is greater than 1". That last statement represents an extension by Mandelbrot of Richardson's thought. Mandelbrot's statement of the Richardson effect is:

 

where L, coastline length, a function of the measurement unit ε, is approximated by the expression. F is a constant, and D is a parameter that Richardson found depended on the coastline approximated by L. He gave no theoretical explanation, but Mandelbrot identified D with a non-integer form of the Hausdorff dimension, later the fractal dimension. Rearranging the expression yields

 

where Fε−D must be the number of units ε required to obtain L. The broken line measuring a coast does not extend in one direction nor does it represent an area, but is intermediate between the two and can be thought of as a band of width 2ε. D is its fractal dimension, ranging between 1 and 2 (and typically less than 1.5). More broken coastlines have greater D, and therefore L is longer for the same ε. D is approximately 1.02 for the coastline of South Africa, and approximately 1.25 for the west coast of Great Britain. For lake shorelines, the typical value of D is 1.28. Mandelbrot showed that D is independent of ε.

See also
 Alaska boundary dispute – Alaskan and Canadian claims to the Alaskan Panhandle differed greatly, based on competing interpretations of the ambiguous phrase setting the border at "a line parallel to the windings of the coast", applied to the fjord-dense region.
 Fractal dimension
 Gabriel's Horn, a geometric figure with infinite surface area but finite volume
 "How Long Is the Coast of Britain? Statistical Self-Similarity and Fractional Dimension", a paper by Benoît Mandelbrot
 Paradox of the heap
 Zeno's paradoxes

References

Citations

Sources 

 Post, David G., and Michael Eisen. "How Long is the Coastline of Law? Thoughts on the Fractal Nature of Legal Systems". Journal of Legal Studies XXIX(1), January 2000.

External links
 "Coastlines" at Fractal Geometry (ed. Michael Frame, Benoit Mandelbrot, and Nial Neger; maintained for Math 190a at Yale University)
 The Atlas of Canada – Coastline and Shoreline
 NOAA GeoZone Blog on Digital Coast
 What Is The Coastline Paradox? – YouTube video by Veritasium
 The Coastline Paradox Explained – YouTube video by RealLifeLore

Paradoxes
Coasts
Cartography
Topography
Fractals
Coastal geography
Problems in spatial analysis